The Asian and Oceanian Zone is one of the three zones of regional Davis Cup competition in 2008.

In the Asian and Oceanian Zone there are four different groups in which teams compete against each other to advance to the next group.

Participating teams

Draw

 relegated to Group II in 2009.
 and  advance to World Group play-off.

First Round Matches

Chinese Taipei vs. Australia

Kazakhstan vs. Thailand

India vs. Uzbekistan

Philippines vs. Japan

Second Round Matches

Australia vs. Thailand

India vs. Japan

First-round play-offs

Kazakhstan vs. Chinese Taipei

Philippines vs. Uzbekistan

Second-round play-offs

Kazakhstan vs. Philippines

References
Draw

Asia/Oceania Zone Group I
Davis Cup Asia/Oceania Zone